Beau Geste is a 1924 adventure novel by P. C. Wren.

Beau Geste may also refer to:
Beau Geste (1926 film)
Beau Geste (1939 film)
Beau Geste (1966 film)
Beau Geste (TV series), a 1982 BBC television serial
"Beau Geste" (song), a song by You Am I